Atractosteus grandei is an extinct species of gar in the family Lepisosteidae. Remains have been found in Lower Paleogene sediments from North Dakota. A. grandei belonged to the genus Atractosteus which includes modern day species of gars such as the giant alligator gar (Atractosteus spatula) and the tropical gar (Atractosteus tropicus).

Description 
A. grandei was a large-bodied gar, reaching  in body length. The species exited approximately 1500–2500 years after the Cretaceous–Paleogene extinction event that killed of most large life on Earth. Atractosteus grandei was a macropredator. It had rhomboid ganoid (fish) scales, a weakly ornamented skull roof and opisthocoelous vertebrae. The body shape of A. grandei had a slender torpedo like body with long snouts and lots of teeth used to hunt prey of freshwater ecosystems.

Discovery 
Atractosteus grandei was discovered in Williston Basin of North Dakota in June 2022. The fossil was 15 centimeters above the Cretaceous–Paleogene extinction event boundary about 66 million years ago making A. grandei the oldest known vertebrate fossil in the Cenozoic. The discovery of Atractosteus grandei suggest that freshwater ecosystems recovered quickly after the asteroid impact that killed of the non-avian dinosaurs.

See also 
Atractosteus africanus (Arambourg & Joleaud, 1943), a species of late Cretaceous period extinct gar that lived in France

References 

Lepisosteidae
Prehistoric fish